Lorentzville is a suburb of Johannesburg, South Africa. It is a small suburb found on the eastern edge of the Johannesburg central business district (CBD), tucked between the suburbs of Bertrams and Judith's Paarl, with Troyeville to the south. It is located in Region F of the City of Johannesburg Metropolitan Municipality.

History
The suburb was founded on one of the original farms on the Witwatersrand, after a strip of land was sold from the farm Doornfontein. The suburbs name has its origins in the name of the Lorentz family, who had lived both in Pretoria and on the Witwatersrand in the Bezuidenhout Valley. JG van Boeschoten, J. Lorentz and R.F. Bertram would purchase the land. It was laid out from 1892 but was later resurveyed in 1902.

References

Johannesburg Region F